, also known by its OSSOS survey designation uo3L91, is a trans-Neptunian object discovered on September 29, 2013 by the Outer Solar System Origins Survey using the Canada–France–Hawaii Telescope at Mauna Kea Observatory.

Discovery 
According to astronomers Mike Brown and Konstantin Batygin, the discovery of  provides additional evidence for the existence of Planet Nine, but Michele Bannister (see ), one of the astronomers who reported the discovery of this object, counters that it travels an orbit that is almost within the plane of the Solar System, rather than being tilted at high angles, as might be expected if it were being shepherded by a Planet Nine.

Its existence was announced in 2016, but the observations were kept private until 2017. It was listed at the Minor Planet Center and the JPL Small-Body Database on 6 April 2017 with a three-year observation arc and an epoch 2017 heliocentric orbital period of 17,500 years.

As of April 2019, its perihelion distance of q= and semi-major axis a= make  a possible sednoid, according to the most common definition of the term (q>, a>). It is listed as a sednoid by some. However,  is usually considered to be an extreme trans-Neptunian object and not a sednoid, due to its high eccentricity which makes the heliocentric orbit unstable. In the heliocentric reference frame, the perihelion is currently rising, and the nominal orbit has a perihelion distance above  only since October 2018.

It will come to perihelion (closest approach to the Sun) around 2055 when it will be  from the Sun.

See also
List of Solar System objects most distant from the Sun

Notes

References

External links 
 OSSOS survey by the Canada–France–Hawaii Telescope
  (18 March 2016); discovery of uo3L91 discussed at 28:13
 

Minor planet object articles (unnumbered)
20130929